Folsom is an unincorporated community in Johnston County, Oklahoma, United States. A post office operated in Folsom from 1894 to 1955. The town was named after David Folsom, who was a well-known Chickasaw.

References

Unincorporated communities in Johnston County, Oklahoma
Unincorporated communities in Oklahoma